Rolf-Göran Bengtsson (born 2 June 1962 in Lund, Sweden) is a Swedish show jumper. He won a silver medal in the 2008 Summer Olympics in the individual jumping, and also a silver medal in the team jumping event at the 2004 Summer Olympics.

From 1997 to 2003 he worked at the stable of Jan Tops in Valkenswaard. Since 2003 Bengtsson lives in Breitenburg in Northern Germany where he runs his own stable together with Bo Kristoffersen.

The Mexican billionaire Alfonso Romo is a major financier to Bengtsson's ventures into the world of international show jumping.

References

External links

1962 births
Living people
Swedish male equestrians
Equestrians at the 1996 Summer Olympics
Equestrians at the 2004 Summer Olympics
Equestrians at the 2008 Summer Olympics
Equestrians at the 2012 Summer Olympics
Equestrians at the 2016 Summer Olympics
Olympic equestrians of Sweden
Olympic silver medalists for Sweden
Swedish show jumping riders
Sportspeople from Lund
Olympic medalists in equestrian
Medalists at the 2008 Summer Olympics
Medalists at the 2004 Summer Olympics